Liam Francis Thompson (born 29 April 2002) is an English professional footballer who plays as a midfielder for  club Derby County.

Career 
Thompson joined the Derby County youth set-up as a teenager, having played youth football with Nottingham-based Dunkirk. During the 2018–19 Under 18 season, Thompson played an influential role in Derby's title-winning campaign. In November 2019, he was named in the League Football Education (LFE) 'The 11' to acknowledge his holistic development on and off the pitch.

Thompson signed his first professional contract with the club in 2020. He made his professional debut for the first team in a 2–0 FA Cup third round defeat at non-league Chorley on 9 January 2021. The entire Derby County first team squad was forced to self-isolate for the game because of positive COVID-19 cases, meaning The Rams' under-23 squad fulfilled the fixture. Thompson continued to work with the first team squad, and appeared on the bench, and in pre-season friendlies against teams including Manchester United.

Thompson made his Championship debut in a 3–2 victory over AFC Bournemouth on 21 November 2021, playing the whole game. He went on to make 23 more appearances throughout the season, as Derby were eventually relegated to League One.

On 2 July 2022, following Derby's takeover by Clowes Developments, Thompson was able to extend his contract with the club until 2024.

Career statistics

References 

2002 births
Living people
Derby County F.C. players
English Football League players
Association football midfielders
English footballers